Paul Turner was a college football player.

Georgia Bulldogs
Turner was a prominent tackle for the Georgia Bulldogs of the University of Georgia, selected All-Southern in 1913. His defensive work in the game against Georgia Tech that year was cited as helping the Bulldogs on the way to a 14–0 victory.

References

All-Southern college football players
American football tackles
Georgia Bulldogs football players
Place of birth missing
Place of death missing
Year of birth missing
Year of death missing